Something Is Killing the Children is an upcoming American horror series made for Netflix. It's based on comic book   Something is Killing the Children  by  James Tynion IV which was published in 2019.

Synopsis
The series alights on a small town plagued by monsters that eat children and reveals a mysterious young woman who has the special powers to combat the creatures

Characters
 Erica Slaughter

Casting 

 Supergirl Star Melissa Benoist will be playing Erica Slaughter

Production 
In 2021, Boom! Studios announced to be in development the project for Netflix. In February 2023, it was announced that Dark and 1899 creators Baran bo Odar and Jantje Friese had been hired to develop the adaptation after Mike Flanagan had departed due to creative differences.

References

External links 
 

2023 American television seasons
2023 American television series debuts
English-language Netflix original programming